The Grand Chalet of Rossinière (Grand Chalet de Rossinière) is one of the oldest chalets in Switzerland, dating to the 18th century. It is located in Rossinière and classed as a historic monument. Claude Roy wrote of it:

Architecture

History
In 1852 it was turned into a hotel, patronised by Englishmen, Americans, Russians and Australians, along with Victor Hugo. The painter Balthus bought it in 1977 and welcomed several artists there until his death in 2001.

The Balthus Foundation
The chalet's grand salon now houses the Balthus Foundation and its many shows, concerts and exhibitions, such as:
 Bijoux et aquarelles d’Harumi - 22 February 2002
 La Jeunesse de Balthus -21 September to 16 November 2003
 Henri Cartier-Bresson et Martine Franck -   4 July to 3 October 2004
 Les Desseins de Balthus - 26 June to 30 October 2005
La Magie du paysage - 2 July to 17 September 2006
 Le Mystère des Chats - 14 July to 16 September 2007
Memorial Day - ceremony for 100 years of Balthus  - 29 February 2008

Bibliography
  Jürg Zbinden, Le Grand Chalet de Rossinière, éditions mo, 2004

References

External links

  Exhibition by Jean-Pierre Neff, carpenter at Rossinière - 2004.
  Official site of the Balthus Foundation

Cultural property of national significance in the canton of Vaud
Swiss culture